Stewart Milne CBE, DBA, DTech (born 23 July 1950) is a Scottish businessman and football club chairman, from Alford, Aberdeenshire.

Milne founded the Aberdeen-based Stewart Milne Construction Group, a housebuilding contractor, in 1975. He started off his business renovating bathrooms. As its chairman and chief executive, he earned the 2005 Scottish Entrepreneur of the Year award. In 2008, he received his Commander of the Order of the British Empire (CBE) for services to the house building industry in Scotland.

Milne is a major shareholder in Aberdeen F.C., and joined the club's board of directors in 1994 to replace Dick Donald, subsequently becoming chairman in 1998. In November 2019, shortly after opening a new training facility on the western outskirts of the city, he announced that he would be stepping down as chairman.

He has an honorary doctorate in business administration from Robert Gordon University (December 2000), and an honorary doctorate of technology from Edinburgh Napier University (November 2007), and an honorary doctorate from Heriot-Watt University, in recognition of his outstanding entrepreneurial contribution to the house building, construction and property development industry and to the Scottish economy, also for services to higher education in Scotland.

Stewart Milne Group sold its timber frame manufacturing subsidiary to Fife-based James Donaldson & Sons in 2021. In April 2022, the group announced that the housebuilding business was up for sale.

Milne has most recently been appointed to the newly formed "Football Monitoring Board" at Aberdeen.  This taskforce has been assembled outwith of any AGM, EGM nor was there any public knowledge of such group. Fellow members are Dave Cormack, Willie Garner and Steven Gunn.

References

1950 births
Living people
Chairmen and investors of football clubs in Scotland
Aberdeen F.C. directors and chairmen
Commanders of the Order of the British Empire
People from Marr
20th-century Scottish businesspeople
21st-century Scottish businesspeople